Bet Mordechai Synagogue of La Goulette, also known as Bessis Synagogue or the Hospital Synagogue is a synagogue located on Rue Khaznadar in La Goulette, a suburb of Tunis, Tunisia.

Architecture 
The building was donated to the community by community-member Isaac Bessis in the 1910s and was designed by Italian architect Benoît Barsotti. Barsotti included both classical and orientalist elements in the design of the building, including acroteria, columns and corniches. Despite its style choices, it does not differ much from other buildings on the street.

Access to the synagogue involves going through a passage that leads to the building facade (now separated from the street). Above the front door of the building are the Stone Tablets of the Ten Commandments. Inside, the sanctuary is a square room centred around four pillars which once supported an upper women's section and a skylight, before renovations in the 1980s replaced it with a portico above the Torah Ark.

The building was reconstructed in 1995 after the roof collapsed a year prior.

References 

Synagogues in Tunisia